Augusto César Lima Brito (born September 17, 1991) is a Brazilian-Spanish professional basketball player for Unicaja of the Liga ACB. He is 6'10" (2.08m) tall and he can play as either a power forward or a center. He is left handed, but at the age of ten, his parents forced him to learn to write and shoot with the right. He was born in Rio de Janeiro.

Professional career
Lima went to Unicaja at 16, to play with the junior teams of the organization. He also combined his playing time with Málaga's farm team, Clínicas Rincón, of the Liga EBA.

Under coach Aíto García Reneses, in 2009–10, in 9 games played in the Spanish League, he averaged 6.4 points and 3.7 rebounds, in 15 minutes per game.

In the next season of 2010–11, his playing time in the Spanish League was limited to 7 games, with an average playing time of 4.6 minutes per game, with his numbers dropping down to 1.7 points, 0.9 rebounds, and 0.3 blocks per game.

Nevertheless, that same season, the Brazilian player had his first good performance in a EuroLeague game, in which he also produced his best performance of the season, in a game against Brose Baskets, the leader of the German League, in which Lima scored 14 points and grabbed 8 rebounds. He averaged 2.9 points and 3.1 rebounds per game during the Euroleague 2010–11 season.

In 2011, he was transferred to CB Granada, to fill the empty roster space following the departure of Robert Kurz, in the inside game of CB Granada, sharing minutes with Paulão Prestes.

In the 2011–12 season, he returned to Clínicas Rincón, a subsidiary of Unicaja, while also playing in 17 games in the Spanish League with the senior men's first team, but with little continuity, due to not having a European passport. On January 26, 2012, Lima acquired Spanish citizenship.

In 2013, Lima was registered in the 2013 NBA draft, but he was not drafted.

On 25 January 2016, Lima agreed a contract until the 2017–18 season with Real Madrid. On July 29, 2016, Real Madrid loaned him to Žalgiris for the 2016–17 season. He helped Žalgiris win the national championship and the cup tournament, and to a successful season in the Euroleague, where they narrowly missed the playoffs. On August 5, 2017, Real Madrid loaned him to Beşiktaş for the 2017–18 season. On December 31, 2017, he left Beşiktaş. On 2 January 2018, Lima signed with the Xinjiang Flying Tigers of the Chinese Basketball Association. After his contract with the Tigers expired, Lima signed with his former team UCAM Murcia. Lima started the 2018-2019 season with Croatian side KK Cedevita, but left the team after changes in the coaching staff. He signed with San Pablo Burgos in December.

On July 18, 2020, Lima signed a three-year deal with UCAM Murcia.

On July 18, 2022, he has signed with Unicaja of the Liga ACB.

National team career 
Lima was a member of the senior men's Brazilian national basketball team that won the silver medal at the 2011 FIBA Americas Championship in Mar del Plata, Argentina, which qualified Brazil for the 2012 Summer Olympics in London, Great-Britain.

In 2013, Lima was summoned again to the Brazilian senior men's team, led by head coach Rubén Magnano, for the initial training phase before the 2013 FIBA Americas Championship, but due to a herniated disc, he had to be cut from the training of the team.

References

External links 

FIBA Profile
Euroleague.net Profile
Eurobasket.com profile
Liga ACB profile 

1991 births
Living people
2019 FIBA Basketball World Cup players
ABA League players
Baloncesto Málaga players
Basketball players at the 2015 Pan American Games
Basketball players at the 2016 Summer Olympics
Basketball players from Rio de Janeiro (city)
BC Žalgiris players
Beşiktaş men's basketball players
Brazilian expatriate basketball people in Lithuania
Brazilian expatriate basketball people in Spain
Brazilian expatriate sportspeople in Croatia
Brazilian expatriate sportspeople in Turkey
Brazilian men's basketball players
CB Axarquía players
CB Granada players
CB Miraflores players
CB Murcia players
Centers (basketball)
Expatriate basketball people in Turkey
KK Cedevita players
Liga ACB players
Medalists at the 2015 Pan American Games
Olympic basketball players of Brazil
Pan American Games gold medalists for Brazil
Pan American Games medalists in basketball
Power forwards (basketball)
Real Madrid Baloncesto players
Xinjiang Flying Tigers players